Gary Hall may refer to:

 Gary Hall (academic) (born 1962), professor of media and performing arts
 Gary Hall (judoka) (born 1990), British judoka
 Gary Hall (taekwondo), British taekwondo team performance director
 Gary Hall Sr. (born 1951), American swimmer, Olympian in 1968, 1972 and 1976
 Gary Hall Jr. (born 1974), his son, American swimmer, Olympian in 1996, 2000 and 2004
 Shequida (born Gary Hall), American drag queen, opera singer and actor

See also
 Gary Hill (disambiguation)